Magnolia Cemetery is a historic cemetery located at Greenwood, Greenwood County, South Carolina.  It was established in 1871, and is laid out in a regular grid plan. It contains approximately 1,600 to 1,800 graves. Grave markers are primarily granite or marble tablets, obelisks, square, or stepped monuments capped with urns. There also are several Confederate grave markers, some of which still feature cast iron Maltese crosses. A Gothic-influenced granite shelter was added in 1922.

The cemetery was named to the National Register of Historic Places in 2004.

Notable interments
 David Wyatt Aiken (1828–1887), Civil War Confederate Army officer, US Congressman

References

External links

 

1871 establishments in South Carolina
Cemeteries on the National Register of Historic Places in South Carolina
Geography of Greenwood County, South Carolina
National Register of Historic Places in Greenwood County, South Carolina
Buildings and structures in Greenwood, South Carolina